This is a list of seasons completed by the Philadelphia Phillies, originally known as the Philadelphia Quakers, a professional baseball franchise based in Philadelphia, Pennsylvania.

The Philadelphia Phillies have completed 131 seasons in Major League Baseball since their inception in 1883. 

As of the conclusion of the 2021 season, the Phillies have played 
in 21,047 regular season games, with a record of 9,935-11,112 (.472). They also have a combined record of 49–55 (.471) in post-season play. This list documents the season-by-season records of the Phillies’ franchise including their year as the “Quakers” and the years where they shared the names “Quakers” and “Phillies.” The team was formed in the National League after the dissolution of the Worcester baseball franchise at the end of 1882, though there is no additional connection between the teams.

At times, the Phillies’ search for success has been seen as an exercise in futility, because of their long stretches of losing seasons, including sixteen consecutive from 1933 through 1948. Compared to the team's early days, the Phillies have recently been more successful than not, with two periods of extended success: the first from 1975 to 1983, when they won five East Division championships as well as the first-half championship in the strike-shortened 1981 season, and the second starting in 2001, with a winning percentage of .540 over those nine seasons, finishing above .500 in all but one, and making the playoffs from 2007 to 2011.

During their record-setting streak of sixteen consecutive losing seasons, the Phillies posted their franchise record for losses in a season in 1941 with 111, falling shy of the modern (post-dead-ball era) Major League record of 120 losses in a season. During the 2007 season, the franchise also became the first professional sports team in American history to reach 10,000 losses. The Phillies have thrice surpassed the century mark for wins in a season: in 1976 with 101 wins, when they made their first playoff appearance in twenty-six seasons; again the next season when they matched that mark; and in 2011, when they set the franchise single-season record for wins with 102 victories and clinched a playoff position at the earliest point in team history. Philadelphia finished the 2010 season with a record of 97–65, marking the first time that the team completed a season with Major League Baseball's best record; they duplicated this accomplishment in 2011 as the majors' only 100-win team. Since 2011, the Phillies have declined again and in 2015 they suffered the worst record in MLB and the franchise's worst since an equally-poor record in 1969, with their worst before then from 1961. However, their fortunes have turned once again since the arrival of Bryce Harper in 2019, culminating in a pennant win in 2022.

Year by year

<onlyinclude>

Record by decade 

The following table describes the Phillies' MLB win–loss record by decade. 

These statistics are from Baseball-Reference.com's Philadelphia Phillies History & Encyclopedia, and are current as of October 2021.

Postseason record by year
The Phillies have made the postseason fifteen times in their history, with their first being in 1915 and the most recent being in 2022.

References

Major League Baseball teams seasons
Seasons
Philadelphia Phillies seasons